Saint Lawrence (225–258) was a Christian martyr.

Saint Lawrence or Saint Laurence may also refer to:

Saints 
 Laurence of Siponto (died c. 545), bishop of Siponto in Italy
 Laurence of Canterbury (died 619), second Archbishop of Canterbury
 Lorcán Ua Tuathail or St Laurence O'Toole (1128–1180)
 Lawrence Justinian (1381–1456), first Patriarch of Venice
 Lawrence of Brindisi (1559–1619), Doctor of the Church
 Lorenzo Ruiz (1600–1637), Chinese-Filipino among the 16 Martyrs of Japan
 Lawrence Ngon and Lawrence Huong Van Nguyen of the Vietnamese Martyrs

Buildings
St. Lawrence Market North, a multi-purpose building in Toronto, Canada
St. Lawrence Market South, a historic market in Toronto
St. Lawrence Hall, a historic cultural hall in Toronto
St Laurence's Church, Bradford-on-Avon, Anglo-Saxon church in Bradford-on-Avon, England

Places
 St. Lawrence River, a large river in North America 
 Estuary of St. Lawrence, an estuary at the mouth of Saint Lawrence river, in Quebec
 St. Lawrence Seaway
 Gulf of St. Lawrence, an estuary
 Saint Lawrence Lowlands, the physiographic region

Australia
 St Lawrence, Queensland, a coastal town, north of Rockhampton

Barbados
 Saint Lawrence, Christ Church, which includes the neighbourhood Saint Lawrence Gap

Belgium
 Sint-Laureins, a village in East Flanders

Canada
 St. Lawrence, Newfoundland and Labrador
 St. Lawrence, Toronto, one of the oldest neighbourhoods in Toronto, Ontario 
 St. Lawrence (electoral district), a former federal riding of Canada in Quebec
 Little St. Lawrence, a local service district and designated place

China
 St. Lawrence Parish, in Macau

Jersey 
 Saint Lawrence, Jersey, a parish of Jersey, in the Channel Islands

United Kingdom
 St Lawrence, Isle of Wight, a small village on the South coast
 St Lawrence, Essex, a small village on the river Blackwater in Essex
 St. Lawrence, a small village in the centre of Ramsgate in Kent
 St Lawrence, a hamlet outside Bodmin, Cornwall

United States
 St. Lawrence, Pennsylvania
 St. Lawrence, South Dakota
 St. Lawrence, Wisconsin, a town
 Saint Lawrence (community), Wisconsin, an unincorporated community
 St. Lawrence County, New York
 St. Lawrence Island, an island of Alaska in the Bering Sea

Schools
St Lawrence Academy (disambiguation)
St. Lawrence's Boys' School, Karachi, Pakistan 
St. Lawrence College (disambiguation), including St. Laurence's
St. Lawrence's Girls' School, Karachi, Pakistan
St. Lawrence High School (disambiguation), including St. Laurence
St Laurence School, Bradford on Avon, England
St. Lawrence University (disambiguation)

Ships
 HMS St Lawrence, a number of ships of the Royal Navy
 St. Lawrence II, a sail training ship launched in 1953
 USS St. Lawrence (1848), a U.S. Navy frigate

Other uses
 St. Lawrence (restaurant), a restaurant in Vancouver, British Columbia
 Saint Lawrence (Zurbarán), a 17th century painting by Francisco de Zurbarán
 St. Lawrence Cathedral (disambiguation)
 St Lawrence's Church (disambiguation)
 St Lawrence Ground, home of Kent County Cricket Club in Canterbury, England
 St. Lawrence Market, a long-running market in Toronto
 St Lawrence railway station (disambiguation)
 St. Lawrence Records, whose subsidiary label Special Agent produced Barbara Acklin's first record
 St. Lawrence Saints ice hockey (disambiguation)
 Gaisford St Lawrence, the family name of the Earl of Howth in Ireland

See also 

Saint Laurent (disambiguation)
San Lawrenz, a village in Gozo, Malta
San Lorenzo (disambiguation)
Sankt Lorenzen (disambiguation)
São Lourenço (disambiguation)